Melker Hallberg (born 20 October 1995) is a Swedish professional footballer who plays as a midfielder for St Johnstone. Hallberg began his senior career at Kalmar FF, then in 2014, he signed for Italian club Udinese, and during his time there went on loan to Vålerenga, Hammarby IF, Ascoli and Kalmar FF. He signed for Vejle BK in 2018, where he spent one season. Hallberg then played in three seasons for Scottish club Hibernian. He made his full international debut for the Sweden national team in 2016, and has won a total of three caps and scored one goal.

Career

Early career
Hallberg grew up in the small town of Ljungbyholm, shortly to the south of Kalmar. There he started with the local club Möre BK where he played for the first team in the seventh tier of Swedish football at age thirteen.

In 2010 Hallberg was brought into the Kalmar FF youth section. Two years later he became the youngest-ever first-team player for the club when he made his Allsvenskan debut at the age of sixteen. On July 15, 2012, Hallberg became the fourth-youngest Allsvenskan goalscorer of all time when he scored the game-winning 2–1 goal against IF Elfsborg. In December 2012 he signed a new four-year contract extension. After his second season in Allsvenskan as a seventeen-year-old, Hallberg was ranked as the 14th-best player in the league by newspaper Expressen.

Udinese
In August 2014, Hallberg signed for Italian club Udinese. He made his debut in January 2015.

In 2015, he was loaned out to Norwegian club Vålerenga Fotball, and in 2016 he was loaned out to Hammarby Fotboll in his native Sweden.

Vejle BK
Hallberg joined Danish club Vejle Boldklub in the summer 2018. He left the club at the end of the 2018–19 season.

Hibernian
Hallberg signed a three-year contract with Scottish Premiership club Hibernian in August 2019. He scored his first goal for the club in a Scottish League Cup tie against Celtic on 2 November 2019. He was released from his contract with Hibernian in January 2022.

St Johnstone
Following his release by Hibernian, Hallberg signed an 18-month contract with St Johnstone in January 2022.

International career
Hallberg has featured regularly at all age levels of Swedish youth national teams. In August 2013 he got selected for the first time ever to the Swedish U21 squad in a friendly against Norway. He was selected for Sweden squads in January 2016 and January 2019.

Career statistics

International 

 Scores and results list Sweden's goal tally first, score column indicates score after each Hallberg goal.

Honours
Individual
Allsvenskan newcomer of the year: 2013

References

External links
 
  (archive)
 

1995 births
Living people
Association football midfielders
Swedish footballers
Swedish expatriate footballers
Kalmar FF players
Udinese Calcio players
Vålerenga Fotball players
Hammarby Fotboll players
Ascoli Calcio 1898 F.C. players
Vejle Boldklub players
Hibernian F.C. players
Allsvenskan players
Serie A players
Eliteserien players
Serie B players
Danish Superliga players
Scottish Professional Football League players
Expatriate footballers in Italy
Expatriate footballers in Norway
Swedish expatriate sportspeople in Norway
Swedish expatriate sportspeople in Italy
Swedish expatriate sportspeople in Scotland
Sweden international footballers
Sweden youth international footballers
Sweden under-21 international footballers
People from Kalmar Municipality
Expatriate footballers in Scotland
St Johnstone F.C. players
Sportspeople from Kalmar County